MRIGlobal is an American independent, not-for-profit, contract research organization based in Kansas City, Missouri, with regional offices in Virginia and Maryland. In addition to its own research laboratories, MRIGlobal operates research facilities for the Department of Energy and the Department of Defense.

MRIGlobal conducts programs in the areas of molecular diagnostics, antimicrobial resistance, therapeutics, engineering, mobile laboratories, CBRNE technology development and countermeasures, chemical testing facilities, real-time biosurveillance, national security and defense, energy and the environment, and agriculture.  The purpose of MRIGlobal is to provide solutions through scientific research, technology development, and technical services for the benefit of government, industry, and the public.

History

Foundation
Founded in 1944 during World War II as Midwest Research Institute, the organization's initial mission was to find a way to convert the ammonium nitrate military ordnance plants in Galena, Kansas, Parsons, Kansas, DeSoto, Kansas and El Dorado, Arkansas to peaceful uses of creating fertilizer.  Among the nine founders was Kenneth A. Spencer who would make a fortune from the Jayhawk Plant in Galena.  Spencer would be chairman of the Institute from 1954 to 1957, and donated money for the Kenneth A. Spencer Laboratories Building and the Spencer Auditorium at MRIGlobal.

MRIGlobal was located initially in the former Westport, Missouri City Hall at 40th Terrace and Pennsylvania.  That building was torn down in 1955 at which time MRIGlobal moved into its current Kansas City headquarters, facing the Nelson Art Gallery, and adjacent to University of Missouri - Kansas City and the headquarters of Russell Stovers candy.

Rapid expansion
MRIGlobal obtained its first contract with NASA in 1961 and its first U.S. Arms Control and Disarmament Agency contract in 1964. In the 1970s, the organization began working for the U.S. Environmental Protection Agency developing tests to detect and measure pollutants.

Expansion and growth continued in the 1980s. In 1982, a venture group was created to commercialize MRIGlobal’s inventions. Major projects included engineering lightweight thermoelectric cooling devices for U.S. Army aircraft. This technology earned an R&D 100 Award, and was used in Operation Desert Storm to keep flight personnel cool while operating in warm climates.

Throughout the next two decades, MRIGlobal expanded its operations, adding locations in Palm Bay, Florida, in 1999; Rockville, Maryland, in 2002; and Frederick, Maryland, in 2003.

In January 2015, MRIGlobal powered their first-ever online detection database, CBRNE Tech Index.

Recent history
On March 1, 2011, the organization was renamed MRIGlobal.

In 2014, MRIGlobal launched CBRNE Tech Index, a comprehensive database of Chemical, Biological, Radiological, Nuclear, and Explosive (CBRNE) detection equipment.

Projects
Soluble coffee for J.A. Folger a forerunner of auto drip coffeemaker (1950s)
National Renewable Energy Laboratory (managed since its start in 1977 as MRIGlobal is part of the Alliance for Sustainable Energy) (1970s)
Maintaining the National Cancer Institute Repository (since the 1980s)
Development of a thermoelectric cooling system for flight personnel and astronauts (1990s)
Ethanol conversion process for the entire corn plant (cob, stalk and leaves—not just the kernels) (in conjunction with NREL and DuPont) (2000s)
Advanced air sampler to detect trace levels of DNA from anthrax spores (2000s)
Producing an HPV vaccine for Phase I clinical trials (2010s)
Supporting the National Institute of Neurological Disorders and Stroke (NINDS) in the development and manufacture of drug candidates for ultimate use in clinical trials (2010s)
Custom designed and fabricated two Containerized Bio-Containment System (CBCS) units for the United States Department of State with private funding from the Paul Allen Ebola Program to serve as flyable medical transport units with full biocontainment for patients with Ebola or other types of highly pathogenic organisms (2010s)
Providing electricity to a remote island village in Tanzania through a 60–80 kWp PV battery-diesel hybrid minigrid (2010s)

References

Contract research organizations
Independent research institutes
Multidisciplinary research institutes
Research institutes established in 1944
Research institutes in Missouri